Rodney Rambo is a retired American soccer defender who played professionally in the MLS & USL A-League.

Rodney Rambo attended and graduated from the University of Portland, playing on the men's soccer team from 1993 to 1996. He graduated in 1997 with a B.B.A which included a double major of Marketing and Management.  In 1997, the Seattle Sounders selected Rodney Rambo in the A-League draft.  On February 1, 1998, the Kansas City Wizards selected Rodney Rambo in the second round (20th overall) of the 1998 MLS Supplemental Draft.  Rodney Rambo played the 1999 & 2000 A-League season with the Long Island Rough Riders.  He also spent part of the 1999 season with the New York Freedom.

References

Living people
1976 births
American soccer players
Long Island Rough Riders players
New York Freedom players
Portland Pilots men's soccer players
A-League (1995–2004) players
USL League Two players
Soccer players from California
Sporting Kansas City draft picks
Association football defenders